The Digital Audio Access Protocol (DAAP) is the proprietary protocol introduced by Apple in its iTunes software to share media across a local network.

DAAP addresses the same problems for Apple as the UPnP AV standards address for members of the Digital Living Network Alliance (DLNA).

Description 
The DAAP protocol was originally introduced in iTunes version 4.0. Initially, Apple did not officially release a protocol description, but it has been reverse-engineered to a sufficient degree that reimplementations of the protocol for non-iTunes platforms have been possible.

A DAAP server is a specialized HTTP server, which performs two functions. It sends a list of songs and it streams requested songs to clients. There are also provisions to notify the client of changes to the server. Requests are sent to the server by the client in form of URLs and are responded to with data in  mime-type, which can be converted to XML by the client. iTunes uses the zeroconf (also known as Bonjour) service to announce and discover DAAP shares on a local subnet. The DAAP service uses TCP port 3689 by default.

DAAP is one of two media sharing schemes that Apple has currently released. The other, Digital Photo Access Protocol (DPAP), is used by iPhoto for sharing images. They both rely on an underlying protocol, Digital Media Access Protocol (DMAP).

Early versions of iTunes allowed users to connect to shares across the Internet, however, in recent versions only computers on the same subnet can share music (workarounds such as port tunneling are possible). The Register speculates that Apple made this move in response to pressure from the record labels. More recent versions of iTunes also limit the number of clients to 5 unique IP addresses within a 24-hour period.

DAAP has also been implemented in other non-iTunes media applications such as Banshee, Amarok, Exaile (with a plugin), Songbird (with a plugin), Rhythmbox, and WiFiTunes.

DAAP authentication 
Beginning with iTunes 4.2, Apple introduced authentication to DAAP sharing, meaning that the only clients that could connect to iTunes servers were other instances of iTunes. This was further modified in iTunes 4.5 to use a custom hashing algorithm, rather than the standard MD5 function used previously. Both authentication methods were successfully reverse engineered within months of release.

With iTunes 7.0, a new 'Client-DAAP-Validation' header hash is needed when connecting to an iTunes 7.0 server. This does not affect third-party DAAP servers, but all current DAAP clients (including official iTunes before iTunes 7.0) will fail to connect to an iTunes 7.0 server, receiving a '403 Forbidden' HTTP error. The iTunes 7.0 authentication traffic analysis seem to indicate that a certificate exchange is performed to calculate the hash sent in the 'Client-DAAP-Validation' header. This authentication has not yet been reverse engineered.

DAAP clients

DAAP servers

See also
 Digital Audio Control Protocol
 Remote Audio Output Protocol

Notes and references

Apple Inc. services
ITunes
Data transmission
Network protocols
Computer-related introductions in 2003